Serkan Yusein (born 31 March 1996) is a Bulgarian professional footballer who plays as a midfielder for Beroe.

Career

Early career and Botev Plovdiv

Born in Plovdiv, Yusein started to play football in the Botev 2002 Academy, before joining the youth formations of Botev Plovdiv. He began his professional career in Botev Plovdiv on 13 March 2013, when he debuted as a substitute in an away match against Minyor Pernik in Sofia.
Serkan was included for the first time in the starting lineup of Botev Plovdiv during a goalless draw with CSKA Sofia on 11 May 2014.

Yusein scored his first goal for Botev Plovdiv on 23 September 2014. He came on as a substitute during the match and scored the last goal for the 0–4 away win against Lokomotiv Mezdra in the first round of the Bulgarian Cup tournament. A few days later, on 27 September, he came on as a substitute during the derby match with Lokomotiv Plovdiv which was won 2–0 by Botev Plovdiv. On 14 December  Serkan played 57 minutes and left good impression on the pitch during Botev's 1-0 defeat by Ludogorets Razgrad.

2015–16 season
Serkan was injured for the first two rounds of the 2015-16 season of the A Group. Following recovery, he took part in the games against Lokomotiv Plovdiv, Pirin Blagoevgrad, Slavia Sofia and Cherno More Varna. After being ruled out again due to injury, Serkan was included in the starting line-up on 30 October, when Botev Plovdiv were defeated 2-0 by Slavia Sofia.

2016–17 season
On 27 August, Serkan scored his first goal in the First League during the 2–1 home victory over PFC Neftochimic Burgas. On 17 September Serkan scored again, this time during the 4–0 home win over FC Lokomotiv Gorna Oryahovitsa. On 22 October 2016 Serkan scored during the 2–3 home defeat from Cherno More Varna.

On 24 May 2017, Serkan came on as a substitute in last minutes of the historical 2–1 win over Ludogorets Razgrad in the Bulgarian Cup final and won the cup with Botev Plovdiv.

2017–18 season
On 13 July 2017, Serkan scored an important goal for the 1–1 away draw with Beitar Jerusalem in the 2nd qualifying round of UEFA Europe League.

On 9 December 2017, Serkan scored a spectacular goal for the 3–0 win over Etar Veliko Tarnovo. A few minutes after that he was sent off. His goal was highlighted as the best goal of the round in Parva Liga.

Ludogorets Razgrad
On 7 January 2019, Ludogorets Razgrad confirmed that Yusein had signed a preliminary contract under the Bosman ruling and is set to join the team as a free agent in June 2019 if the negotiations between Botev and Ludogorets in January didn't end with a transfer agreement, but on 23 January both teams reached agreement and Yusein joined the team for an undisclosed fee.

International career
Yusein received his first call up for the Bulgaria on 12 November for the UEFA Nations League matches against Finland on 15 November 2020 and Republic of Ireland on 18 November.

Career statistics

Club

Honours
Botev Plovdiv
Bulgarian Cup (1): 2016–17
Bulgarian Supercup (1): 2017

Ludogorets Razgrad
First Professional Football League (1): 2018–19
Bulgarian Supercup (1): 2019

References

External links

1996 births
Living people
Bulgarian footballers
Bulgaria under-21 international footballers
Bulgaria youth international footballers
Bulgarian people of Turkish descent
Association football midfielders
Botev Plovdiv players
PFC Ludogorets Razgrad players
FC Tsarsko Selo Sofia players
FC CSKA 1948 Sofia players
PFC Beroe Stara Zagora players
First Professional Football League (Bulgaria) players
Second Professional Football League (Bulgaria) players